Austroblechnum penna-marina, synonym Blechnum penna-marina, known as Antarctic hard-fern, alpine water fern and pinque (Chilean Spanish), is a species of fern in the family Blechnaceae, with a natural range from the Araucanía Region to the south and from the coast to the tree line of the Magellanic forests in Chile and adjacent areas of Argentina. It is also found in New Zealand, Australia and some Pacific islands.

Gallery

References

Sources
 Florachilena.cl

Blechnaceae
Ferns of Argentina
Ferns of Chile
Flora of the Juan Fernández Islands
Flora of Gough Island
Flora of Macquarie Island
Flora of the Prince Edward Islands
Plants described in 1804